Greening is a surname. Notable people with the surname include:

 Colin Greening (b. 1986), Canadian ice hockey player
 Henry Thomas Greening (1730–1809), gardener to King George II at Windsor
 Ivan Lewis Greening (b. 1980), birth name of musician Ivan Moody
 John Greening (b. 1950), former Australian rules footballer
 Jonathan Greening (b. 1979), English footballer
 Justine Greening (b. 1969), English politician and Member of Parliament
 Karen Greening (b. 1962), Canadian rock and jazz singer a.k.a. Lee Aaron
 Kevin Greening (1962–2007), British radio presenter
 Mark Greening, musician with the band Electric Wizard
 Paul Greening (1928–2008), British courtier
 Phil Greening (b. 1975), former English rugby union player
 Philip Greening (1824–1906), American politician and blacksmith
 Rhondi Greening, pen name of Rhondi A. Vilott Salsitz, American science fiction and fantasy author
 Thomas Greening (1882–1956), English cricketer

References 

English-language surnames